Alex Magee (born April 28, 1987) is an American football defensive end who is currently a free agent. He was drafted by the Chiefs in the third round of the 2009 NFL Draft. He played college football at Purdue.

He also played for the Tampa Bay Buccaneers.

High school career
MaGee was a two-time Class 7A First-team All-State as a junior and senior at Oswego High School. As a senior, he recorded 60 tackles, including 11 for loss and eight sacks. Alex also help lead his team to a 7A State Championship as the Oswego Panthers defeated the Libertyville Wildcats 28–21 in (2OT). NBC Sports Chicago listed Magee as one of the best defensive lineman in the history of Illinois high school football.

College career
As a senior at Purdue in 2008, Magee played left defensive end, after being a right defensive end and had 28 tackles (14 solos) while causing and recovering a fumble. He also had career-high 3.5 sacks while making six stops behind the line of scrimmage.
In 2007 Magee started all 13 games and recorded 38 tackles (24 solo) with 4.5 going for losses and he also broke up 2 passes, forced a fumble, recovered two fumbles, and blocked two kicks. In 2006, he appeared in all 14 games including seven starts, and had 33 tackles (20 solo, 13 assists) including 2.5 sacks, with one interception, one forced fumble, one fumble recovery. and one blocked kick. In 2005, he played in all 11 games, with two starts and had 18 tackles (10 solo, 8 assists), including 1.0 for loss.

Professional career

2009 NFL Draft

Kansas City Chiefs
Magee was drafted 67th overall in the 3rd round by the Kansas City Chiefs. He played at the defensive end spot in the Chiefs' new 3-4 defense.

Tampa Bay Buccaneers
On October 19, 2010 Magee was traded to the Tampa Bay Buccaneers for conditional draft picks. He was cut on September 3, 2011.

Utah Blaze
On June 19, 2012 Alex Magee was assigned to the Utah Blaze of the Arena Football League.

Chicago Rush
On June 21, 2013, Magee was assigned to the Chicago Rush. Magee finished the season with the Rush, recording 2.0 sacks playing in just 3 games.

Arizona Rattlers
On September 6, 2013, Magee was assigned to the Arizona Rattlers after he was selected in the dispersal draft of Rush and Blaze players. He was placed on recallable reassignment on May 26, 2015.

Spokane Shock
On June 3, 2015, Magee was assigned to the Spokane Shock. He was placed on reassignment on June 16, 2015.

References

External links
Purdue Boilermakers bio
Kansas City Chiefs bio

1987 births
Living people
People from Oswego, Illinois
Players of American football from Illinois
American football defensive tackles
American football defensive ends
Purdue Boilermakers football players
Kansas City Chiefs players
Utah Blaze players
Chicago Rush players
Arizona Rattlers players
Spokane Shock players
Sportspeople from the Chicago metropolitan area
Tampa Bay Buccaneers players